Vekkalam is a revenue village located the in Kannur district in Kerala, India.

Demographics
 census in India, Vekkalam had a total population of 6585, including 3224 males and 3361 females.

Governance
Village office is situated at Nedumpoil. 

The Election Commission of India appointed five booth level officers. The officers are N. Rajan- Menachody School, Sumesh-Vayannur School, Sabu Joseph-GUPS Vekkalam, TD John Aided UP School Vekkalam Booth147 and Rajan -Aided UP School Vekkalam Booth-148.

Schools 
The four schools in Vekkalam are:
Govt. UP School Vekkalam
Palayad, Govt. LP School Vayannur
Govt. UP School Menachody
Aided UP School Vekkalam

Religious sites
Christian Churches include St.Jude's Church Kallumuthirakkunnu, Fathima Matha church Aryaparamba, India Pentecostal Church of God, St.Sebastian's Church Nedumpuramchal and Mar Gregorious Jacobite Church Varapedika. 

Temples include Sri. Muthapan Madappura, Eerayikkolly, Chovva Kavu Vayannur, Vairi Ghathakan Temple, Vayannur and Koottakkalam Temple, Aryaparamba. Mosque in the Village is Juma Masjid Perunthody.

Infrastructure
The village has a 66 KV Sub Station functioning under KSEB at Nedumpoil. Vijaya Bank is at Nedumpuramchal and Bank of India is in Perumthody.

Nedumpoil and Vayannur are the post offices.

Transport
The national highway passes through Kannur town, connecting Mangalore and Mumbai on the northern side and Cochin and Thiruvananthapuram on the southern side. The road to the east of Iritty connects to Mysore and Bangalore. The nearest railway station is Kannur on the Mangalore-Palakkad line.

References

Villages near Iritty